Joaquim Vital (born 24 August 1884, date of death unknown) was a Portuguese wrestler. He competed in the middleweight event at the 1912 Summer Olympics.

References

External links
 

1884 births
Year of death missing
Portuguese male sport wrestlers
Olympic wrestlers of Portugal
Wrestlers at the 1912 Summer Olympics
Sportspeople from Lisbon